Samuel Kotey Neequaye (born 5 July 1983) is a Ghanaian professional boxer who held the WBA-NABA lightweight title in 2013. As an amateur he represented Ghana at the 2008 Olympics.

References

External links

1983 births
Living people
Boxers from Accra
Ghanaian male boxers
Lightweight boxers
Light-welterweight boxers
Welterweight boxers
Boxers at the 2008 Summer Olympics
Olympic boxers of Ghana